Elektra Natchios is a character appearing in American comic books published by Marvel Comics. Created by Frank Miller, the character first appeared in Daredevil #168 (Jan. 1981). She is a love interest of the superhero Matt Murdock / Daredevil, but her violent nature and mercenary lifestyle divide the two, before she ultimately becomes the second Daredevil in 2020.

The character is a highly trained assassin of Greek descent who wields a pair of sai as her trademark weapons. Elektra is one of Frank Miller's best-known creations, and has appeared in numerous modern storylines even though Marvel had originally promised not to revive the character without Miller's permission. She has also appeared as a supporting character of the X-Men's Wolverine and in other series and mini-series, as well as adaptations for the screen.

Jennifer Garner portrayed Elektra in the films Daredevil (2003) and Elektra (2005), while Élodie Yung portrayed the character in the Marvel Cinematic Universe television series Daredevil and The Defenders.

Publication history 

Created by Frank Miller, Elektra first appeared in Daredevil #168 (January 1981). Miller initially based the character's appearance on Lisa Lyon, a female bodybuilder. Miller originally intended this issue, which was essentially a filler story, to be Elektra's only appearance, but she instead became a frequently appearing villain in Daredevil until her death in issue #181 (April 1982). She was resurrected shortly after, but the story contained a narrative note which indicates that Daredevil must never encounter her again.

After over a decade's absence, she reappeared in Daredevil #324–327 (Jan.–April 1994), and went on to a brief stint as a supporting character in Wolverine (in #100–106). Daredevil writer D. G. Chichester recounted that he and editor Ralph Macchio had discussed the character's return several times:

This upset Frank Miller, who claimed that Marvel had previously promised him that the character would not be used in any publication. She has since appeared in two eponymous ongoing series and several mini-series.

Fictional character biography

Family and early life 
Elektra was born on the island of Cyprus, near the Aegean Sea, to Hugo Kostas Natchios and his wife Christina. She had an older brother named Orestez.

Two contradictory accounts of her family history have been given. In Elektra: Root of Evil #1–4 (March–June 1995), Christina is killed by assassins hired by Orestez, while in Elektra #18 (1995), she is killed by an insurrectionist during the Greek Civil War. In both accounts, she gives premature birth to Elektra just before dying.

When nine-year-old Elektra was assaulted by kidnappers, the men were all killed by Orestez, who had grown into an accomplished martial artist after leaving home. Orestez advised his father that Elektra needed to learn self-defense. Hugo hired a sensei to teach her the martial arts.

In Elektra: Assassin #1 (Aug. 1986), the adult Elektra has vague memories of being raped by her father as a five-year-old. Years of counseling and medication had convinced her this was a false memory, but the doubt remained. Elektra grew up close to her father but was plagued by dark visions and voices with no known source. She occasionally reacted to them with self-harm. Her father eventually sent her away to psychotherapy to become more stable. It was uncertain whether Elektra actually became more stable or merely appeared to be.

Activities as an adult 

Hugo Natchios eventually served as a Greek ambassador to the United States. Nineteen-year-old Elektra attended Columbia University in New York City. There, Elektra began dating classmate Matt Murdock.

A year later, Elektra and her father were kidnapped by terrorists. A rescue attempt by Matt went wrong, and Hugo Natchios was gunned down. Elektra lost faith and hope. She quit Columbia and returned to China to study martial arts. Stick, a member of the benevolent organization called the Chaste, recognized the darkness in her soul and attempted to train her himself, but she ultimately sided with the Hand, a sect of mystical ninja who trained her as an assassin. She later broke away from them and became an independent agent, and in this role she again encountered Matt Murdock, who was now active as Daredevil. She defeated Daredevil in her mission to kill the criminal Alarich Wallenquist. However, she failed her assignment, and Daredevil had to save her from being killed by Eric Slaughter, revealing his secret identity to her in the process. Although the pair worked together to fight the Hand, they also came into conflict frequently.

Elektra later battled the Hand alongside Daredevil and Gladiator. She then battled Kirigi.

She soon became the chief assassin in the employ of New York City's premier crime lord, the Kingpin. She attempted to kill Daredevil after he tried to stop her from terrorizing Ben Urich. The Kingpin then assigned her to kill Matt Murdock's partner, Franklin "Foggy" Nelson. When Nelson recognized Elektra as Matt's college girlfriend, she was unable to kill him.

Elektra was fatally stabbed by Bullseye with one of her own sai in a battle over which of them would be the Kingpin's assassin. Elektra managed to crawl to Daredevil's house before dying in his arms as Bullseye watched the two, hidden among a crowd that had gathered to see what was going on. Later, members of The Hand stole her body and attempted to resurrect her. Daredevil, with the assistance of Stone, a member of Stick's order, intervened, defeating The Hand ninja. Daredevil then tried to revive Elektra himself. Although his attempt failed, it did have the effect of purifying Elektra's soul. Elektra's body subsequently disappeared, as did Stone.

Later, Stone somehow resurrected Elektra and then sent her to aid the X-Man Wolverine, at a time when he had been physically and mentally regressed to a bestial form. She helped retrain him to the point where he could think and vocalize as a human once more, and spent time with him thereafter as he returned to his normal form, including taking him with her on a return to her ancestral home.

Some time after her partnership with Wolverine ended, it was revealed that when Elektra was resurrected by Stone, Elektra's evil aspect had been physically split apart from her in its own body as a consequence of the ritual performed by Daredevil. Her darker half, calling itself Erynys, fought Elektra and was killed by her, thus returning the dark side to Elektra's soul.

She was hired by Nick Fury to assassinate Saddam Abed Dassam, the leader of Iraq who was in league with HYDRA, and retrieve the Scorpio Key from them. Fury hired her as a way to avoid accountability in global political circles. Along the way HYDRA tried to hire her, an offer she refused. They then set the Silver Samurai on to her and it appeared she killed him though he appeared alive and well in other comics. When she eventually obtained the Key, she refused to give it to Fury, believing that he could not be trusted with such a powerful weapon. She instead gave it to the police officer who had killed her father stating that he had a debt to her and he would not let her down.

Wolverine: Enemy of the State 
Elektra worked with S.H.I.E.L.D.

HYDRA and The Hand joined forces, killing off various heroes and resurrecting them into their possessed warriors, including the X-Man Wolverine, who became their killing machine. Based on her relationship with Logan and her ties to the Hand, Nick Fury hired Elektra to lead the mission, paying her in excess of $200,000, more money in one day than the (then) yearly salary of the President of the United States. She worked to stop Wolverine from killing others as well as to try to turn him back to his normal self. During a fight with The Hand, Elektra was killed and resurrected as a Hand warrior, eventually becoming their leader. Along with the X-Man Northstar and other superhumans killed and resurrected by the Hand, Elektra attacked Nick Fury, injuring him badly and causing the destruction of a S.H.I.E.L.D. helicarrier.

Thanks to S.H.I.E.L.D., Wolverine eventually came to his senses and wanted revenge. During a fight with Elektra, she mentally spoke to him, using new abilities given to her by the Hand. She explained that being killed by The Hand was all part of a plan she had from the beginning. She explained that she had been resurrected by The Hand and infiltrated the organization, making them believe they had been successful in resurrecting her as a brainwashed warrior. She told him that they would take The Hand and HYDRA down together. They fought off many ninjas and were victorious. Gorgon, however, attacked Elektra and threw off her mental blocks, enabling him to read her thoughts and see where Fury was being treated for his injuries (he also discovered that the Vatican also hired her, to kill him). Gorgon teleported, with Elektra, to kill Fury. When they arrived, Elektra ordered the S.H.I.E.L.D. soldiers to attack. Gorgon used his power on her neck and she collapsed. Wolverine eventually used Gorgon's own powers against him, defeating him.

In an email to Kitty Pryde, Nick Fury told her that Elektra had survived, but was missing and was probably in Eastern Europe, creating her own militia group, which she intended to be her own version of The Hand. He also told Kitty that Elektra was no threat ... so far. It was unknown where Elektra really was or what her plans were, but it was during the time following the destruction of the helicarrier that she was abducted by Skrulls and replaced with an imposter.

Daredevil and the Kingpin 
She resurfaced to help Daredevil with a situation with the Kingpin. The crime lord, in exchange for his freedom, offered the FBI irrefutable evidence that Matt Murdock was Daredevil.

It was revealed that Elektra actually helped Kingpin gain all the needed information back when she was Daredevil's enemy, and she returned because she felt an obligation to help Matt out of the trouble for which she felt responsible. It was also revealed by the Black Widow that Elektra is now the leader of The Hand.

Daredevil meets up with Elektra, the Black Widow, and the new White Tiger in front of the building that holds the "Murdock Papers" (the evidence Kingpin was talking about). They intended to retrieve the papers before the FBI could get there, but were suddenly attacked by Bullseye. Daredevil and Elektra fought the villain and, after a lengthy and bloody battle, won. However, Daredevil was suddenly shot by Paladin (who was working for FBI operatives) and was left bleeding profusely in Elektra's arms. Elektra then takes Matt to the Night Nurse, but insists that The Hand should cure him. Black Widow appears and objects. While Elektra and Black Widow fight, The Hand heals Matt Murdock.

Outside the Night Nurse's medical office, reporters and police gather. Elektra then jumps out the side window, along with The Hand to drive off the police and FBI. She gets in a quarrel with Luke Cage, and quickly exits the scene at Matt's request.

It was later revealed that this Elektra was actually a Skrull and not the real Elektra.

Replacement by Skrulls 

Elektra seemingly reappears, appearing to be corrupted by the Hand. She kills, resurrects, and imprisons the vigilante Maya Lopez, intending to use her as a weapon. The New Avengers rescue Lopez and she ends up stabbing Elektra to death. However, upon her death it is revealed that "Elektra" is actually a Skrull in disguise; its death indicates that the Skrulls have become undetectable to even the heightened senses of New Avengers members Spider-Man, Wolverine, and Doctor Strange. The corpse is given to Iron Man by Spider-Woman.

The Mighty Avengers #16 reveals that Elektra was selected to be replaced by a Skrull imposter named Siri. She was targeted by several Skrull impostors while staying in Japan, however, Elektra fought and killed most of these Skrulls (including Siri), before being blindsided and severely beaten by a Super Skrull manifesting Invisible Woman's invisibility and Colossus' organic steel armor. A Skrull named Pagon took Elektra's place since Siri was killed by Elektra. Pagon's death was planned all along, being their major "reveal" of their intent to take over the world's superheroes.

The real Elektra was revealed to be alive upon one of the Skrull Ships and was released during the final battle between the heroes and the Skrulls. Iron Man immediately orders her held in protective custody at S.H.I.E.L.D.

Dark Reign 
Being the only Skrull captive showing signs of experimentation and torture, Elektra finds herself weakened by multiple injuries. Norman Osborn orders her studied and monitored to obtain information as to why this was the case.
Paladin breaks into H.A.M.M.E.R. (formerly S.H.I.E.L.D.) headquarters intending to kill Elektra for $82 million. She overpowers Paladin and chokes him by spitting her broken tooth down his throat. She forces him to surrender the keys to her to escape. Before leaving the cell, she murders the interrogator who was torturing her for info. She finally makes her escape after taking down several H.A.M.M.E.R. operatives and manages to reach Matt Murdock's office to raid his stash of first aid supplies. After being confronted by Foggy Nelson, she collapses from extensive blood loss due to her injuries.

Elektra wakes up handcuffed to a hospital bed in the Night Nurse's clinic. The nurse explains that she bound Elektra for her own safety, although the ninja easily frees herself. Their conversation is interrupted when a hit woman named Nico breaks in and attempts to kill both of them. Elektra sends Nico flying out the window then arms herself with the ninja's weapons while telling the Night Nurse to escape. Elektra jumps into the alley and battles Nico, only to find that another hit man named Carmine is also attempting to kill her with a sniper rifle from a rooftop. She manages to defeat Nico while evading Carmine's shots and obtains some clues from Nico as to why she was being targeted for assassination. On the rooftop, Carmine is murdered by Bullseye (in the guise of Hawkeye), who was sent by Norman Osborn to kill Elektra.

Elektra climbs to the top of the building to confront the third assassin, only to be taken aback when she discovers that he is Bullseye. Although initially hesitant, she stands her ground and faces her killer. The two begin to fight when Nico manages to reach the rooftop to check on Carmine. Bullseye attempts to kill her with a drug laced arrow, but she is saved by Elektra (who accidentally gets the drugs on the arrow in her system in the process). Bullseye then kicks the seemingly sedated Elektra off the building, but she manages to land safely. Bullseye follows and confronts her on the street, attempting to kill her with her own sai, much like their first encounter. However, this time Elektra outmaneuvers him and stabs him through the back with one of his own arrows. Nico once more interrupts the fight, attempting to shoot a fleeing Bullseye, then confronting a heavily drugged, helpless Elektra. H.A.M.M.E.R. agents enter the fray and shoot Nico, but are ambushed and killed by Wolverine before they can finish Elektra off.

After escaping H.A.M.M.E.R., Wolverine reveals to Elektra where Nico ran, and Elektra tries to confront the problem head on and peaceably end the conflict. Arriving at the Blackhawk crash site, she discovers that Agent Brothers, a former S.H.I.E.L.D. agent, was the one who put a price on her head. Brothers claims that she was responsible for killing hundreds of S.H.I.E.L.D. agents during the Blackhawk incident. Elektra, having no memory of the incident, denies the accusations and urges both Brothers and Nico to go in peace, stating that it was her Skrull impostor who was responsible for the incident. However, Norman Osborn then appears, and reveals that Elektra was in fact abducted after the Helicarrier attack, although she has no memory of this because she had used a mind trick to "forget" her resurrections and the incidents surrounding them to prevent the Skrulls from accessing them during her abduction. Norman taunts Elektra to undo this mind trick, and Elektra obliges. It is then revealed that Elektra is actually guilty of the accusations. She then proceeds to kill both Nico and Brothers.

Code Red 
Elektra was involved in an incident with the Red Hulk, X-Force, a new villain called the Red She-Hulk and a few other well known mercenaries such as Deadpool and the Punisher.

Shadowland 

In Shadowland storyline, Stick tries to convince Elektra to help stop the Hand from corrupting Matt. However she refuses, because she wanted him to be cold-hearted just like her out of spite for him. She reconsiders when she witnessed the broadcast of Daredevil killing Bullseye. She joins the Hand so she can gain intel on the Shadowland fortress to help the super heroes infiltrate it. Later upon rejoining the Hand, Elektra visits Daredevil and Typhoid Mary at Bullseye's grave intending to resurrect him. She then helps sneak the super heroes into the building, to stop Daredevil from resurrecting Bullseye. A fight erupts and just when Elektra tried to reach out to Matt, the Demon of the Hand finally possesses him. Once he defeats all of the super heroes, Iron Fist used his chi energy on the demon to help heal Matt's soul. While that was happening, Elektra entered Matt's mind to encourage him fight the evil presence of the demon. Matt killed himself to stop the demon from causing any more chaos. Elektra later resurrected him.

Thunderbolts
As part of the 2012 Marvel NOW! branding, Elektra becomes a member of Red Hulk's Thunderbolts.

Agent of S.H.I.E.L.D.
During the Avengers: Standoff! storyline, Elektra was incarcerated for some unknown reason in Pleasant Hill, a gated community established by S.H.I.E.L.D. S.H.I.E.L.D. used the powers of Kobik to turn her into Sheriff Eva. During this time, she was in love with Absorbing Man's altered human form of an ice cream vendor named Henry. After Baron Helmut Zemo and Fixer started using a machine to turn all the inmates back to normal, Elektra was among those restored. She talked Absorbing Man out to harming the innocent lives at Pleasant Hill.

During the Civil War II storyline, Elektra joined S.H.I.E.L.D. to free her conscience of the deaths of the passengers of the crashed Black Hawk. She took the position of field director when Phil Coulson left the group. When Coulson was trying to interfere with Captain Marvel's plans to use Ulysses Cain's abilities to stop crime before it happens, Elektra discovered that Leo Fitz was Coulson's mole in her group which Maria Hill was alerted to. At the same time, she also reinstated Grant Ward into S.H.I.E.L.D. and placed an explosive collar on his neck to ensure his loyalty.

Becoming Daredevil 
During Chip Zdarsky's run on Daredevil, Elektra seeks out Murdock to help form an organization called The Fist to take down The Hand once and for all. Matt is not interested in this, so, to prove herself trustworthy to Matt, she takes up the mantle of Daredevil and protects Hell Kitchen while Matt is in prison.

Powers and abilities 
Elektra's primary abilities are a strong knowledge of martial arts and weaponry. Elektra learned ancient martial arts of China, Siam, and Japan. She is a master combatant with the Okinawan sai, her usual weapon of choice. She is also highly skilled with the katana, daggers, three-section staff, and shuriken. She is a master of many Japanese combat forms including Ninjutsu, Aikido and Karate. Elektra is an Olympic-level athlete, strong in gymnastics and swimming, with a high level in athleticism, human strength, speed, stamina, agility, dexterity, reflexes and reactions, coordination, balance, and endurance. She is resistant to pain and extreme heat and cold. She is also able to keep to the shadows and move with such speed that she can remain unseen even in daylight.

Elektra has the ability to mesmerize others, and as such make them see illusions or other phenomena.

Elektra also has the ability to "throw" her mind into those of others. For instance, she was able to track down her enemy, Ken Wind, by temporarily "borrowing" people's minds and acting through them while she hunted around for her prey. This temporary mind control enables her to metaphorically sniff out the psyche, or intent, of her targets. It saw extensive use during Elektra: Assassin, in which she was heavily reliant on only her ninja powers.

Elektra can communicate telepathically with individuals possessing similar levels of mental discipline, such as the Chaste. She mastered this ability during training with The Hand, which mentally links her to The Beast, the demigod of The Hand. She is able to shield her mind from others.

She can see glimpses of future events across precognitive visions.

Reception

Critical reception 
Lukas Shayo of Screen Rant asserted, "Her background makes her nature as a hero all the more interesting. Much like Matt Murdock used Daredevil to help cope with his doubts and guilt, Elektra used the mantle to prove that she was more than a mercenary. Desperate to prove that she was not all terrible, her need for redemption made her an extraordinary hero."

Accolades 

 In 2011, Comics Buyer's Guide ranked Elektra 22nd in their "100 Sexiest Women in Comics" list.
 in 2017, The Daily Dot ranked Elektra 16th in their "Top 33 female superheroes of all time" list.
 In 2020, TheWrap included Elektra in their "24 Badass Female Superheroes" list.
 In 2020, CBR.com ranked Elektra 1st in their "10 Deadliest Female Assassins Of The Marvel Universe" list.
 In 2021, Screen Rant included Elektra in their "10 Best Marvel Martial Artists" list.
 In 2022, CBR.com ranked Elektra 1st in their "15 Best Daredevil Love Interests" list, 7th in their "Marvel: 10 Best Reformed Villains" list, 8th in their "Marvel's 10 Best Infiltrators" list, and 10th in their "10 Most Violent Marvel Heroes" list.
 In 2022, Screen Rant included Elektra in their "10 Best Street-Level Heroes In Marvel Comics" list and in their "15 Most Powerful Daredevil Villains" list.

Other versions

What If? 
In the story "What If Elektra Had Lived?", penned by Frank Miller, Elektra's murder at the hands of Bullseye does not occur as Bullseye is cut down and killed while trying to escape from prison. Elektra spares Franklin Nelson's life, irritating the Kingpin, who swiftly orders her execution. After fighting off several assassination attempts, Elektra flees to Matt Murdock's brownstone home. Murdock initially wants to take Elektra into custody, but she warns him that with the Kingpin putting a bounty on her head, she will die at the hands of his agents if she is sent to prison. Murdock decides to flee New York with Elektra, putting up his home for sale and cutting off contact with Nelson. The couple are last seen enjoying a quiet sunset on a beach, far removed from society and seemingly happy.

Exiles 
In one of the universes visited by the Exiles, Elektra was one of the few remaining survivors in a world ravaged by HYDRA and their leader, Sue Storm. Elektra is shown to be the lover of Reed Richards, and is a key player in the revival of the inhabitants of that earth. Her abilities are identical to that of her mainstream version.

House of M 
Elektra appears as one of the assassins of the Kingpin and is later hired by John Proudstar to bring down Luke Cage's "Avengers".

Marvel Mangaverse 
In the Marvel Mangaverse, Elektra is evil and works for the Hand. When she is first introduced she encounters Daredevil who at first refuses to believe that she was working for the enemy. After a tearful reunion they kiss and she says to him "You tried to save my soul once. Unfortunately there was nothing there worth saving" and then proceeds to cut him in half. Later, during her fight with Carol Danvers, she shows remorse for having killed him. Elektra thanks Carol when Carol cuts her in half with her own blades.

Marvel Zombies 
In the Ultimate Fantastic Four arc "Crossover", Elektra is seen among the zombie hordes preparing to attack Magneto, Mr. Fantastic, and the few living humans they are protecting. She is also among the zombies that attack (and infect) Frank Castle. The infected Wolverine from this incident travels to another Earth where he kills the human Elektra with his claws, impaling her through the stomach in the manner of Bullseye.

MC2 
In the MC2 Universe (an alternate future primarily focused on the children of current Marvel superheroes), Elektra married Wolverine and the two had a daughter named Rina Logan, a.k.a. Wild Thing. Very little is said about the future of Elektra, although we do see that she is actively involved in parenting Rina. Additionally, it is shown that she is wealthy enough to have an "extra-dimensional" credit rating.

Elektra also has a cameo in Spider-Girl where she is hired by the Black Tarantula to be Spider-Girl's martial arts instructor. Though not knowing Spider-Girl's true identity, Elektra quickly surmises that she is the daughter of Spider-Man based on how she talks, fights and carries herself.

Mutant X 
In the Mutant X Universe – an alternate world which was visited by the Earth-616 (mainstream Marvel Universe) Havok – Elektra (surname: Stavros), while still equally trained as a martial artist and assassin, is the nanny and bodyguard of Scotty Summers. Scotty is the son of that reality's Alex Summers and Madelyne Pryor. Elektra stays close to Scotty, protecting him from repeated assaults by his mother, the Goblin Queen, and her brainwashed allies. Following the disappearance of the Goblin Queen, she indulges in an affair with Havok. She seemingly dies near the end of the series, though Scotty reassures Alex that she will come back.

Ultimate Marvel 
 See also: Ultimate Daredevil and Elektra and Ultimate Elektra for information on the two starring miniseries.
In the Ultimate Marvel universe, Elektra Natchios is a student at Columbia University who has a knack for martial arts and is a great fan of Bruce Lee. Her mother died of breast cancer when she was 6, and her father is trying to make money with a laundromat.

In this universe, she starts out as a sweet, innocent girl who cares deeply for her loved ones – so deeply that she is willing to go over dead bodies to help them. This trait starts her descent into becoming one of the most deadly assassins in the world.

There is a gap between the Elektra featured in Ultimate Daredevil and Elektra and Ultimate Elektra and the one shown in Ultimate Spider-Man. In the first two arcs, she is a normal college student, but in the last arc – which is set a few years later – she has become the Kingpin's right hand and is a villainess. She is hired by an unknown person to kill a Latverian terrorist, but Spider-Man prevented her from doing it. She is shown in this universe as a highly dangerous and skilled killer, and was able to take down the likes of Hammerhead, Black Cat, Moon Knight, and Spider-Man easily. She was later put into a coma when Moon Knight threw one of his crescent blades at her, hitting her in the head when she was about to kill Black Cat.

PunisherMax 
A more "realistic" version of Elektra appears in the PunisherMAX series, from Marvel's MAX imprint. This version of the character is Japanese: the Hand lends her services as a bodyguard to the Kingpin, especially to protect him from the Punisher. She also becomes the Kingpin's lover. It is revealed that Elektra was secretly hired by Kingpin's ex-wife Vanessa to assassinate him for failing to prevent the murder of their son Richard. It is also revealed that she is in a lesbian relationship with her. Elektra eventually has a final confrontation with the Punisher to save Vanessa. She manages to seriously wound the Punisher, but is shot several times and left permanently incapacitated. Later, a representative from the Hand has one of his men finish her with a sword.

Secret Wars (2015) 
During the Secret Wars storyline, there are two different Elektras that exist in Battleworld:

 A Wild West version of Elektra resides on the Battleworld domain of the Valley of Doom. She is seen as a minion of Governor Roxxon alongside Bullseye, Grizzly, and Otto Octavius where they were first seen intimidating Judge Franklin Nelson into leaving town so that he wouldn't preside over Red Wolf's trial. Sheriff Steve Rogers and Red Wolf later fought the villains which ended with Otto Octavius being killed in battle, Bullseye killing Sheriff Rogers, and Natasha Barnes diverting the remaining villains in the other direction so that she can hide Red Wolf. Elektra and Grizzly later fought Red Wolf again where they end up defeated by him.
 Elektra is known as Red Sai, the leader of the Red Hand school in the wuxia-inspired K'un-L'un region of Battleworld. Due to an oath made by a previous master of the Red Hand to serve every emperor of K'un-L'un, she serves as Emperor Zheng Zu's assassin.  Red Sai is also the former friend and lover of Shang-Chi, the emperor's son, who was exiled for the murder of Lord Tuan, the previous master of the Iron Fist. During the tournament to decide the new ruler of K'un-L'un, Red Sai and Rand-K'ai, Tuan's pupil, fight Shang-Chi in the penultimate round of the Thirteen Chambers.  During the fight, Red Sai confesses that Zu had sent her to assassinate his rival Tuan but ultimately failed. To spare his lover and her students from the emperor's wrath, Shang-Chi killed Tuan; Zu implicated and exiled his son for the murder to cover his own involvement. After the truth is revealed, Red Sai and Rand-K'ai let Shang-Chi pass so that he could defeat his father. After Shang-Chi emerges victorious, Red Sai pledges herself to the new emperor.

In other media

Television 

Elektra appears in Marvel's Netflix television series, portrayed by Élodie Yung as an adult and by Lily Chee in flashbacks.

 First appearing in the second season of Daredevil (2015), this version was trained by Stick from childhood until the Chaste deemed her too dangerous and he had her adopted by a Greek ambassador to keep her safe. While in college, she met and dated Matt Murdock. In the present, Stick sends her back to New York City to make him return to his side and help defeat the Hand. Though she falls in love with him, they break up after she fails to make Murdock kill Roscoe Sweeney for killing his father years prior. Murdock attempts to reconcile with her by convincing her to leave Stick and become her own person, but she seeks revenge on Stick after one of his assassins attacks her. When Stick gets kidnapped by the Hand, Elektra and Murdock work together to find him, discovering she was destined to become the Hand's leader "Black Sky" in the process, though he helps her choose her own path. She later sacrifices herself to save Murdock from the Hand's forces, but they dig up her body and prepare to revive her.
 Elektra appears in The Defenders. Revived and now working for the Hand as a brainwashed assassin, she is tasked with killing Chaste members and anyone who can threaten their plans, running afoul of Danny Rand, Colleen Wing, and Jessica Jones in the process. When Murdock, Rand, Jones, and Luke Cage join forces to form the Defenders and combat the Hand, Elektra is sent to attack them, but is defeated by Rand. Following this, she slowly regains her memories, but kills Stick and kidnaps Rand for the Hand's leader Alexandra Reid before killing her, assuming control of the group, and manipulating Rand into helping her unearth ancient caverns filled with dragon skeletons said to contain the secret to eternal life. As the Defenders rescue Rand and set explosives in the Hand's headquarters, Murdock stays behind to reach Elektra before they share a kiss and disappear in the explosion. While Murdock survives, Elektra's fate is left ambiguous.

Film 
 Elektra appears in the 20th Century Fox film Daredevil (2003), portrayed by Jennifer Garner. This version is the daughter of billionaire Nikolas Natchios, who had her trained in martial arts after she witnessed her mother's death at a young age. In the present, she encounters and falls in love with Matt Murdock before witnessing Nikolas' death. Initially assuming Daredevil was the culprit, she attacks him, only to learn he is Murdock. Realizing Bullseye is her father's killer, she confronts him, but is fatally stabbed, left for dead, and dies in Murdock's arms.
 Elektra appears in a self-titled spin-off film, portrayed again by Jennifer Garner. In this film, it is revealed that she was once a martial arts prodigy called the "Treasure". Following her death, Stick resurrected her and trained her in Kimagure, which grants the practitioner precognition and the ability to resurrect the dead. Due to her rage and fear of seeing her mother's killer however, she is expelled from Stick's training compound and becomes a contract killer. Years later, she finds herself protecting a target she was meant to kill but became acquainted with, Mark Miller, and his daughter Abby Miller, the current "Treasure", from the Hand.
 Following her previous film appearances, Elektra's film rights reverted to Marvel Studios in 2014 and became available for use in the Marvel Cinematic Universe.

Video games 
 Elektra makes a cameo appearance in Marvel Super Heroes vs. Street Fighter as one of Apocalypse's prisoners.
 Elektra appears as a boss in the Daredevil (2003) tie-in game as a brainwashed servant of the Kingpin until Daredevil eventually frees her.
 Elektra appears in a self-titled film tie-in mobile game.
 Elektra appears as a playable character in Marvel Nemesis: Rise of the Imperfects, voiced by Jani Jakovac.
 Elektra appears as a playable character in Marvel: Ultimate Alliance, voiced by Gabrielle Carteris. Additionally, her assassin, stealth, and a white-colored version of her Ultimate Marvel outfits appear as alternate skins.
 Elektra appears as a playable character in Marvel Super Hero Squad Online.
 Elektra appears in LittleBigPlanet via the "Marvel Costume Kit 2" DLC.
 Elektra appears as a boss, later unlockable character in Marvel Avengers Alliance.
 Elektra appears as a playable character in Lego Marvel Super Heroes, voiced by Laura Bailey. This version works for the Kingpin.
 Elektra appears as a playable character, in Marvel Heroes, voiced by Kathryn Cressida.
 Elektra appears as a playable character in Marvel Contest of Champions.
 Elektra appears as a playable character in Marvel: Future Fight.
 A Marvel Noir-inspired incarnation of Elektra named Eliza appears as a playable character in Lego Marvel Super Heroes 2.
 Elektra appears as a playable character in Marvel Strike Force.
 Elektra appears as a playable character in Marvel Ultimate Alliance 3: The Black Order, voiced again by Kathryn Cressida.
 Elektra appears as a playable character in Marvel Puzzle Quest.
 Elektra appears in Marvel Snap.

Miscellaneous 
 Elektra appears in the Marvel Comics Super Heroes collection of commemorative postage-stamps.
 Elektra appears in a Marvel-licensed slot machine.

Bibliography

By Frank Miller 
In addition to her signature appearances in Daredevil, Elektra starred in three series produced by her creator, Frank Miller:
 Elektra Saga #1–4 (Marvel Comics, 1984) (reprints of material from Daredevil #168, 174-177, 181-182, 187-190 and Bizarre Adventures #28)
 Elektra: Assassin #1–8 (Marvel Comics, 1986, with Bill Sienkewicz)
 Elektra Lives Again original graphic novel (Marvel Comics / Epic Comics, 1990)

Additional series 
Elektra has also headlined the following series:
 Elektra vol. 1 #1–4 (Marvel Comics, 1995)
 Elektra Megazine #1–2 (Marvel Comics, 1996, reprint series)
 Elektra vol. 2, #1–19 (Marvel Comics, 1996–1998)
 Elektra vol. 2, #-1 (Marvel Comics, 1997, "FlashBack Month" issue)
 Peter Parker: Spider-Man / Elektra '98 Annual (Marvel Comics, 1998)
 Elektra vol. 3, #1–35 (Marvel Comics / Marvel Knights, 2001–2004)
 Issue 3 was recalled by Marvel due to featuring nude images of the character. An edited version was later reissued to retailers.
 Elektra and Wolverine: The Redeemer #1–3 (Marvel Comics, 2002)
 Elektra: Glimpse & Echo #1–4 (Marvel Comics / Marvel Knights, 2002)
 Elektra: The Hand #1–5 (Marvel Comics, 2004)
 Dark Reign: Elektra #1–5 (Marvel Comics, 2009)
 Shadowland: Elektra one-shot (Marvel Comics, 2010)
 Elektra vol. 4, #1–11 (Marvel Comics, 2014–2015)
 Elektra vol. 5, #1-5 (Marvel Comics, 2017)
 Daredevil: Woman Without Fear #1-3 (Marvel Comics, 2021)
 Elektra: Black, White & Blood #1-4 (Marvel Comics, 2021)

Ultimate Marvel 
An alternate version of Elektra starred in the following series set in the fictional Ultimate Marvel Universe:
 Ultimate Daredevil and Elektra #1–4 (Marvel Comics, 2002)
 Ultimate Elektra #1–5 (Marvel Comics, 2004)

Collected editions

Ultimate Universe

Intercompany crossovers 
Elektra has been featured in crossovers with characters from other publishing companies:
 Elektra/Cyblade one-shot (Marvel Comics / Top Cow Productions, 1997)
 Witchblade/Elektra one-shot (Top Cow Productions / Marvel Comics, 1997)

See also 
 Women warriors in literature and culture
 Electra

References

External links 
 Elektra at Marvel.com
 Elektra at Don Markstein's Toonopedia. Archived from the original on June 17, 2016.
 
 

Characters created by Frank Miller (comics)
Comics characters introduced in 1981
Daredevil (Marvel Comics) characters
Fictional aikidoka
Fictional assassins in comics
Fictional Columbia University people
Fictional female assassins
Fictional female ninja
Fictional Greek Cypriot people
Fictional Greek people
Fictional hypnotists and indoctrinators
Fictional immigrants to the United States
Fictional karateka
Fictional melee weapons practitioners
Fictional murdered people
Fictional Ninjutsu practitioners
Fictional women soldiers and warriors
Marvel Comics female superheroes
Marvel Comics martial artists
Marvel Comics orphans
Marvel Comics sidekicks
Marvel Comics telepaths